Journal of Insect Science may refer to either one of the following two journals:
 Journal of Insect Science (Entomological Society of America)
 Journal of Insect Science (Indian Society for the Advancement of Insect Science)